Events in the year 2022 in Ghana.

Incumbents

Events 
Ongoing — COVID-19 pandemic in Ghana

 20 January – A truck carrying explosives to a gold mine explodes after crashing into a motorcycle in Apiate, Western Region; the explosion destroyed nearby buildings and vehicles, killing 17 people and injuring 59 others.

Deaths 
Kwesi Botchwey, 78, Ghanaian politician, minister for finance and economic planning (1982–1999)

See also 

African Continental Free Trade Area
COVID-19 pandemic in Africa

References 

 
2020s in Ghana
Years of the 21st century in Ghana
Ghana
Ghana
2022 in Ghanaian sport